Andy's Gone With Cattle is a poem by Australian writer and poet Henry Lawson. It was first published in The Australian Town & Country Journal on 13 October 1888.

The "Andy" of this poem re-appeared in a sequel, "Andy's Return", which was published in the same journal some six weeks later.

Critical reception

The Oxford Companion to Australian Literature states: "[the poem] laments the departure of a member of a selection family to go overlanding cattle."

Trivia

 Some of the best-known lines in the poem were revisions of Lawson's originals by David McKee Wright when the poem was being prepared for publication in Lawson's Selected Poems in 1918.
 The "Andy" of this poem is not the same "Andy" as described in Lawson's poem "Middleton's Rouseabout".

Further publications

 In the Days When the World was Wide and Other Verses by Henry Lawson (1896)
 An Anthology of Australian Verse edited by Bertram Stevens (1907)
 Selected Poems of Henry Lawson (1918)
 Favourite Australian Poems edited by Ian Mudie (1963)
 From the Ballads to Brennan edited by T. Inglis Moore (1964)
 Poems of Henry Lawson edited by Walter Stone (1973)
 Australia Fair: Poems and Paintings edited by Douglas Stewart (1974)
 The World of Henry Lawson edited by Walter Stone (1974)
 The Essential Henry Lawson edited by Brian Kiernan (1982)
 A Treasury of Colonial Poetry (1982)
 A Camp-Fire Yarn: Henry Lawson Complete Works 1885-1900 edited by Leonard Cronin (1984)
 The Illustrated Treasury of Australian Verse edited by Beatrice Davis (1984)
 Henry Lawson: An Illustrated Treasury compiled by Glenys Smith (1985)
 The Bushwackers Australian Song Book edited by Jan Wositzky and Dobe Newton (1988)
 A Collection of Australian Bush Verse (1989)
 A Treasury of Bush Verse by G. A. Wilkes (1991)
 Australian Bush Poems (1991)
 The Penguin Book of Australian Ballads edited by Elizabeth Webby and Philip Butterss (1993)
 The Illustrated Treasury of Australian Verse compiled by Beatrice Davis (1996)
 Classic Australian Verse edited by Maggie Pinkney (2001)

See also
 1888 in poetry
 1888 in literature
 1888 in Australian literature
 Australian literature

References 

1888 poems
Poetry by Henry Lawson